Connoquenessing is a borough in Butler County, Pennsylvania, United States. The population was 528 at the 2010 census.

Geography
Connoquenessing is located southwest of the center of Butler County at  (40.818096, -80.013708). It is bordered by Connoquenessing Township to the north, east, and west, and by Forward Township to the south, east, and west. The borough takes its name from Connoquenessing Creek, a Beaver River tributary which flows through a valley just south of the borough.

Pennsylvania Route 68 passes through the borough, leading northeast  to Butler, the county seat, and southwest  to Evans City.

Demographics

As of the census of 2000, there were 564 people, 199 households, and 161 families residing in the borough. The population density was 395.4 people per square mile (152.3/km2). There were 204 housing units at an average density of 143.0 per square mile (55.1/km2). The racial makeup of the borough was 99.29% White, 0.18% African American, 0.18% Native American, and 0.35% from two or more races. Hispanic or Latino of any race were 1.42% of the population.

There were 199 households, out of which 41.2% had children under the age of 18 living with them, 71.4% were married couples living together, 9.0% had a female householder with no husband present, and 18.6% were non-families. 14.6% of all households were made up of individuals, and 7.5% had someone living alone who was 65 years of age or older. The average household size was 2.83 and the average family size was 3.18.

In the borough the population was spread out, with 28.5% under the age of 18, 6.4% from 18 to 24, 31.9% from 25 to 44, 21.3% from 45 to 64, and 11.9% who were 65 years of age or older. The median age was 35 years. For every 100 females there were 100.0 males. For every 100 females age 18 and over, there were 91.9 males.

The median income for a household in the borough was $43,864, and the median income for a family was $48,000. Males had a median income of $40,268 versus $28,611 for females. The per capita income for the borough was $17,111. About 4.1% of families and 6.7% of the population were below the poverty line, including 5.9% of those under age 18 and 15.5% of those age 65 or over.

References

External links
Borough of Connoquenessing official website

Populated places established in 1795
Boroughs in Butler County, Pennsylvania